The Port of London Deal Porters' Union was a trade union in the United Kingdom. It merged with the Transport and General Workers' Union in 1939. The union represented deal porters, who handled baulks of imported softwood at the Port of London, principally around the Surrey Commercial Docks at Rotherhithe.

See also
 List of trade unions
 Transport and General Workers' Union
 TGWU amalgamations

References
Arthur Ivor Marsh, Victoria Ryan. Historical Directory of Trade Unions, Volume 5 Ashgate Publishing, Ltd., Jan 1, 2006 pg. 435

Defunct trade unions of the United Kingdom
Port workers' trade unions
Trade unions disestablished in 1938
Transport and General Workers' Union amalgamations
Trade unions based in London